Pachynoa fruhstorferi is a moth in the family Crambidae. It was described by Hering in 1903. It is found in Indonesia (Sulawesi).

References

Moths described in 1903
Spilomelinae
Moths of Indonesia